Stratodus is a genus of giant prehistoric aulopiform fish found in Cretaceous-aged marine strata of Kansas, Alabama, Morocco, Israel, and Niger, South Dakota, Jordan. It has also been found in the Tamaguélelt Formation of Mali, dating to the Lower Eocene, indicating that Stratodus survived the Cretaceous-Paleogene extinction event. This sleek fish has an upper jaw filled with multiple rows of tiny teeth and was the largest aulopiform, reaching 5 meters in length.

History of Discovery 
Stratodus was initially described by Edward Drinker Cope in Kansas during 1872, naming the type species S. apicalis, and described a second species in 1877, S. oxypogon, both species being assigned to the family Stratodontidae. S. oxypogon is now often considered a synonym of S. apicalis, and the family was shifted from Stratodontidae to Dercetidae, but now has gone back to Stratodontidae.

For the 19th and 20th centuries, Stratodus was only known from poor fossils, usually of the skull. It wasn't until 2008 that a nearly complete skeleton of S. apicalis in the Upper Niobrara Formation was uncovered along the bank of the Missouri River of Oacoma, South Dakota, and other well preserved remains have subsequently been found in the  Muwaqqar Chalk Marl Formation of Harrana, Jordan. A second species, S. indamanensis, was described from Niger. In 2019, fossils of S. apicalis were been found in Mali dating to the Eocene.

Description 
The body is long and slender, anguiliform in shape, and is covered in thick, spiny scutes. An elongated dorsal fin runs down the back.

Perhaps the most striking feature of Stratodus were it's conical, inward pointing teeth. Stratodus possessed multiple rows of these teeth which could reach . These teeth were extremely numerous, with at least 6,000 being present in the fish's mouth, to the point that over 1,000 of the teeth are oriented outside of the jaws on the lips of the fish.

Stratodus was related to Ministratodus, a member of Stratodontidae with a similar body plan but smaller size.

Paleoecology 
During the Late Cretaceous, Stratodus had a cosmopolitan distribution on both sides of the North Atlantic Ocean, along with North Africa and Arabia. It lived in shallow, epicontinental waters only a few meters deep. While modern aulopiformes are often ambush predators, Stratodus appears capable of active hunting, owing to a muscular and hydrodynamic body, and swam in an anguilliform-esque fashion. It's hunting strategy has been hypothesized to resemble that of billfish, using its external teeth to injure prey before returning to devour them, indicated by its external teeth and club-like protrusion at the end of its skull. It was likely a protogyneus hermaphrodite.

Stratodus is one of the few large fish to exist on both sides of the K-Pg boundary, surviving the asteroid that caused the extinction of most other megafauna. In the Eocene, Stratodus inhabited brackish-to-marine tropical waters in the Trans-Saharan Seaway, living alongside animals like Palaeophis colossaeus and Rhabdognathus.

References

Prehistoric aulopiformes
Prehistoric ray-finned fish genera
Cretaceous bony fish
Cretaceous fish of Asia
Cretaceous fish of Africa
Cretaceous fish of North America
Mooreville Chalk
Fossils of Mali
Fossils of Morocco
Fossils of Israel
Fossils of Niger
Eocene Africa